Ornithoprion is an extinct genus of eugeneodont holocephalan closely related to Caseodus. It lived in the Moscovian stage of the Carboniferous from 315.2 to 307 million years ago. Various species had an elongated lower jaw. The discovery and description of Ornithoprion helped establish many aspects of eugeneodont skull anatomy, which previously could only be gleaned from tooth data.

References

Carboniferous fish of North America
Carboniferous cartilaginous fish
Prehistoric cartilaginous fish genera